Clearer may refer to:

 Clearing house (finance)
 Yarn clearer